Roman Latković (born April 10, 1960) is a writer, U.S. asylee, journalist, globetrotter and a former Croatian political commentator. He was an outspoken opponent of Croatian president Franjo Tuđman, and wrote scathing commentary of the Croatian political system in Novi list, in the 1990s. He fled the country in 1996 and was granted the political asylum in the United States in 1998.

Infamous attack by governmental TV 

On January 10, 1996 during the prime time TV Dnevnik (TV Daily) reaching 80% of the population, the government controlled Hrvatska Radiotelevizija (Croatian Radio-television) unleashed an eight (8) minutes long attack on Latkovic.

That attack, initiated by the president of Croatia at that time, Franjo Tudjman, created a political mass-hysteria resembling McCarthyism that lasted over three (3) months and prompted a witch-hunt against Latkovic who went into hiding to avoid assassination.

Political asylum in the United States 

Lawyers Committee for Human Rights represented Roman Latkovic in his fight for political asylum in the United States and has published his case in its Critique: Review of the U. S. Department of State's country reports on human rights practices for 1995.

Kemal Kurspahić book Prime time crime: Balkan media in war and peace  (US Institute of Peace Press, 2003) gives Roman Latkovic the attention he richly deserves: "Roman Latkovic observed that it (year 1997) would be remembered for the final unmasking of Franjo Tuđman who led the country to ruin. Latkovic's comment was based on the fact that Tudjman had used his imperial presidential power to prevent the opposition-nominated Zagreb mayor from taking office despite the election results. "Croatia headed by Tudjman is being reduced to a dictatorship, a Mafia-type banana republic and everybody's worst nightmare", Latkovic's commentary said. Croatian state television (HTV) immediately fired back, stating on prime-time news that "certain forces personified by Roman Latkovic have taken off their masks" and should instantly be included among "Croatia's enemies". Soon after Latkovic's commentary, the government dispatched the financial police to Novi List.

Burn this house: the making and unmaking of Yugoslavia by Jasminka Udovički, James Ridgeway (Duke University Press, 2000) shares interesting info about Mr. Latkovic as well as The South Slav Journal by Dositey Obradovich Circle (University of Michigan) and Mark Thompson also writes about Latkovic's "intolerable life" in his book Forging war: the media in Serbia, Croatia, Bosnia and Hercegovina (University of Luton Press, 1999).

Summit for Peace and Reconciliation (2013) 

The Summit was held in Banja Luka, a capital of Republika Srpska (RS) on 9–11 June 2013. Its purpose was to help build an infrastructure for moving forward on political and governmental reforms and to begin the process of finding commonality in the areas of reconciliation and return. Roman Latkovic acted as a researcher, consultant and a director documenting the event for Bishop Franjo Komarica. Bishop Komarica visited the United States in December 2012. He traveled to Washington D.C and presented the pressing issues that require addressing to move RS forward. Bishop Komarica commenced a dialogue with the US Department of State, USAID and members of the US Congress. The Summit was video documented by Latkovic:
 The Summit's highlights
 The Summit's intro

Books 

Roman Latkovic has published several books:

Koh-I-NOOR za Kraljicu Margot (Koh-I-Noor for Queen Margot), a short-story collection, 1990, Rijeka,
Pavana za umrlu djevojcicu (Pavane for a Dead Girl), a novel, 1991 / 1992, Rijeka - Osijek,
Jules and Jim (Jules and Jim), a novel, 1993, Rijeka,
Vilinska Istra; a never-ending story (Betwitching Istria; a never-ending story), a curious photo-travelogue (with Ranko Dokmanovic), 1994, Italy, a book that had been translated into English, Italian and German languages,

In 2009 he published his first book in the U.S., 
SEO: Facts and Fiction, a tech work on the Search Engine Optimization (with Robert F. Smallwood),
TWITTER: THE DARK SIDE - Does Bit.ly Enable a Massive Click Fraud? is his second publication in the United States (October 2009) a work he co-authored with his colleague Robert LaQuey, Ph.D.

Articulating Europe by Jonas Frykman, Peter Niedermuller, Københavns Universitet has a moving passage on Latkovic's Bewitching Istria.

As Trygve E. Wighdal 

In August 2019 Latkovic, under the pseudonym "Abbot Trygve E. Wighdal," published "Jung's Demon, a serial-killer's tale of love and madness"

In June 2022, Latkovic published his second book as Trygve E. Wighdal, titled "Tycho Brahe Secret"

Awards 

"Capra d'Oro" the first prize award for the achievements in revitalizing the cultural life of the Istrian Peninsula. Istrian Tourist Union, Porec, Croatia: 1995
The Best Short Story Award, Radio Television Zagreb, Zagreb, Croatia: 1972

References 

Living people
1960 births
Croatian journalists
Croatian emigrants to the United States